Piano Sonata in E minor may refer to:

 Piano Sonata No. 27 (Beethoven)
 Piano Sonata (Grieg)
 Piano Sonata Hob. XVI/34 (Haydn)
 Piano Sonata No. 10 (Prokofiev)
 Piano Sonata in E minor, D 566 (Schubert)
 Piano Sonata in E minor, D 769A (Schubert)